Huba Rozsnyai (14 December 1942 – 4 December 2020) was a Hungarian sprinter. He competed in the men's 100 metres at the 1964 Summer Olympics. Rozsnyai died from COVID-19 during its pandemic in Hungary.

References

External links
 

1942 births
2020 deaths
Athletes (track and field) at the 1964 Summer Olympics
Hungarian male sprinters
Olympic athletes of Hungary
Athletes from Budapest
Deaths from the COVID-19 pandemic in Hungary